Johann Gottlieb Hensel (born 1728 in Hubertusburg, died 1787 in Freiburg im Breisgau) was a German actor.
He was associated with some of the leading theatres of the 18th century, such as the Ackermann Company in Hamburg, the Hamburg National Theatre and the Seyler Theatre Company, and was mentioned by Lessing in the Hamburg Dramaturgy and lauded for his portrayal of comic old people and servants. He is however best known as the first husband of the far more prominent actress Friederike Sophie Hensel, later Seyler (née Sparmann), a prominent figure in the history of theatre in the 18th century.

Career

Hensel was born Hubertusburg. He joined the troupe of Harlekin Kirsch in Lusatia in 1754. In 1755 he married the actress Friederike Sophie Sparmann, and they both joined the troupe of Franz Schuch in Breslau at the end of the year. In 1757 they joined Konrad Ernst Ackermann's company in Hamburg. They lived apart from the end of 1757, when his wife went to Vienna, and later divorced. Friederike Sophie would later marry the famous theatre director Abel Seyler.

In 1758 Johann Gottlieb Hensel joined the Kirchhoff Company. In 1764 he had rejoined the Ackermann Company. In 1767 he was one of the members of the Hamburg National Theatre led by Abel Seyler; he was mentioned by Lessing in the Hamburg Dramaturgy and lauded for his portrayal of comic old people and servants. At the end of 1767 he joined Karl Theophil Döbbelin's company. In 1769 he joined the Seyler Theatre Company; finally, he joined the company of Joseph Voltolini, and stayed with Voltolini until his death.

Uncharacteristic for a protestant, his funeral was carried out in a most festive way with the participation from Catholic clergy as well as actors and academics.

In the history of theatre Hensel is best known as the first husband of the actress Friederike Sophie Hensel, later Seyler, the leading German actress in the second half of the 18th century.

References

1728 births
1787 deaths
German male stage actors
Seyler theatrical company
18th-century German male actors